Heavenly Place is Jaci Velasquez' debut major label album, released on May 13, 1996 on Myrrh Records.

Critical reception

Rodney Batdorf wrote in his AllMusic review that "Heavenly Place is an impressive debut album from the 16-year old singer." This album includes five radio singles, including "On My Knees," which won a GMA Dove Award for Song of the Year in 1998.

Track listing

Track information and credits taken from the album's liner notes.

Personnel 

 Jaci Velasquez – lead vocals, backing vocals (1–4, 6, 10)
 Mark Heimmerman – keyboards (1, 2, 3, 5–10), drum programming (1, 2, 5–8), backing vocals (3, 4, 10), additional arrangements (4), keyboard programming (7), acoustic piano (9)
 Phil Naish – acoustic piano (4)
 George CocchinI – guitars (1, 2, 7)
 Dann Huff – guitars (2–6, 9, 10)
 Jackie Street – bass (1–7, 9, 10)
 Scott Williamson – drums (2, 3, 4, 6, 9, 10)
 Terry McMillan – percussion (1–5, 7, 9)
 Bobby Taylor – oboe (4)
 David Hamilton – string arrangements and conductor (4)
 Carl Gorodetzky – concertmaster (4)
 The Nashville String Machine – strings (4)
 Sally Jumper – backing vocals (3, 4, 9)
 Chris Rodriguez – lead vocals (5), backing vocals (5, 7), guitars (8)
 Nicole C. Mullen – backing vocals (7)
 D.L. Turnedge – backing vocals (7)

Production

 Mark Heimmerman – producer (1, 2, 3, 5–10)
 Phil Naish  – producer (4)
 Judith Cotton Volz – executive producer, A&R direction
 Kathi Dement – A&R coordination
 Joe Baldridge – engineer (1, 2, 3, 5–10), mixing
 Eric Elwell – engineer (1, 2, 3, 5–10)
 Todd Robbins – engineer (1, 2, 3, 5–10)
 Ronnie Brookshire – engineer (4)
 Dave Dillbeck – assistant engineer (4)
 Dean Jamison – assistant engineer (4)
 Joe Costa – mix assistant
 Mike Wrucke – mix assistant
 Fun Attic Studio, Franklin, Tennessee – recording location (1, 2, 3, 5–10)
 Dark Horse Recording Studio, Franklin, Tennessee – recording location (1, 2, 3, 5–10)
 Studio at Mole End, Franklin, Tennessee – recording location (4)
 Great Circle Sound, Nashville, Tennessee – strings recording location (4)
 House of David and Battery Studios, Nashville, Tennessee – mixing locations
 Hank Williams – mastering at Master Mix, Nashville, Tennessee
 PJ Heimmerman – production manager (1, 2, 3, 5–10)
 Bridgett Evans O'Lannerghty – production coordinator (4)
 Christy Coxe – art direction
 Firehouse 101 Art + Design – design
 Matthew Barnes – photography

Charts

Certifications

References

1996 debut albums
Jaci Velasquez albums
Myrrh Records albums